Cyrus Hostetler (born August 8, 1986) is an American javelin thrower who competed at the 2012 Summer Olympics and 2016 Summer Olympics.

High school
At Newberg High School, Cyrus lettered in football, basketball, and baseball. He did not pick up a javelin until his senior year of high school. At the PAC-9 District Meet, Cyrus took first in javelin with a throw of 60.7 meters (199'2" feet) and also placed fifth in triple jump. He also took third place at the Oregon State Meet, with a throw of 61.49 meters (201'5" feet). Cyrus finished the year at the 2005 USA Junior Nationals with a personal best of 62.55 meters (205'2" feet) and taking fifth place.

College career

Weber State University
In the fall and winter seasons, Cyrus worked on his weight throw and hammer throw. After straining his elbow at the Oregon Preview, Cyrus tore his ulnar collateral ligament in a meet at BYU four weeks later. After the season, Cyrus asked to be released, so he could compete for another school the next year.

Lane Community College
At Lane Community College, Cyrus played on the basketball team as well as the track and field team. In his last meet of the 2007 season, Cyrus threw a personal best of 63.56 meters (208'6" feet), placing second at the NWAACC championships.

Cyrus competed at the NWAACC conference decathlon in 2008, finishing fourth with 5,995 points. At the NWAACC championships, Cyrus threw a personal best in the javelin with a throw of 73.63 meters (241'7" feet), which qualified him for the 2008 U.S. Olympic Trials. He placed eighteenth in javelin at the U.S. Olympic Trials.

University of Oregon
In his first year at the University of Oregon, Cyrus threw a personal best in javelin with a throw of 81.16 meters (272'10" feet). He won the Pac-10 Conference championship and placed fourth in the 2009 NCAA championships. He also placed fourth at the 2009 USA Championships. Two weeks later, Cyrus tore his ACL, MCL and medial meniscus playing basketball.

In his senior year of college, Cyrus won his second straight Pac-10 Conference javelin championship. He placed tenth at the 2010 NCAA championships. He placed ninth in the 2010 USA Championships, after once again tearing his ACL, MCL, and medial meniscus on his third throw.

Professional career
Cyrus took third place in javelin at the 2011 USA Championships in Eugene, Oregon. He also competed at the 2011 Toronto International Track & Field Games, placing second throwing 77.72 meters (255' feet). At the 2011 Pan American Games, Cyrus earned the silver medal with a season-best throw of 82.24 meters (269'10" feet), also achieving the 2012 Summer Olympics A standard. He placed fifth in javelin at the U.S. Olympic trials, but was one of the three javelin throwers who had the Olympic A standard. In the Javelin Throw at the 2012 Summer Olympics, Cyrus placed thirty-second in the qualifying with a throw of 75.76 meters.

Seasonal bests by year
2006 - 62.55
2007 - 63.56
2008 - 77.19
2009 - 83.16
2010 - 78.19
2011 - 82.24
2012 - 81.02
2013 - 74.93
2014 - 80.28
2015 - 75.72
2016 - 83.83 (5/21)
2017 - 83.12

References

1986 births
Living people
American male javelin throwers
Athletes (track and field) at the 2012 Summer Olympics
Athletes (track and field) at the 2016 Summer Olympics
Olympic track and field athletes of the United States
Oregon Ducks men's track and field athletes
People from Newberg, Oregon
Sportspeople from the Portland metropolitan area
Track and field athletes from Oregon
Pan American Games silver medalists for the United States
Lane Community College alumni
Pan American Games medalists in athletics (track and field)
Athletes (track and field) at the 2011 Pan American Games
USA Outdoor Track and Field Championships winners
Medalists at the 2011 Pan American Games